Staats Cotsworth (February 17, 1908 – April 9, 1979) was an actor in old-time radio. He is perhaps best known for playing the title role in Casey, Crime Photographer.

Early years 
Staats Cotsworth Jr. was born in Oak Park, Illinois, the son of Staats and Dorothy (Bodley) Cotsworth. He had a brother, John Littlefield Cotsworth. In 1929, he received a diploma in the Department of Art from the Pennsylvania Museum's School of Industrial Art.

Radio 
Cotsworth was once described as "the busiest actor in radio," having performed in 7,500 broadcasts in 12 years. His roles as a regular cast member included those shown in the table below.

Other programs on which Cotsworth appeared included The Chase, These Are Our Men, X Minus One, Mr. Keen, Tracer of Lost Persons, The Right to Happiness, Cavalcade of America, Grand Central Station, The Story of Mary Marlin, and Silver Theater.

Stage 
Cotsworth's professional debut on stage was in Alice in Wonderland, produced by Eva LeGallienne. His Broadway credits include First Episode (1934), Othello (1935), Macbeth (1935 and 1941–1942), Damaged Goods (1937), As You Like It (1937), Stop-Over (1938), Madame Capet (1938), Boudoir (1941), She Stoops to Conquer (1949–1950), Richard III (1953), Inherit the Wind (1955–1957), Pictures in the Hallway (1956), I Knock at the Door (1957), Advise and Consent (1960–1961), The Right Honourable Gentleman (1965–1966), Weekend (1968), A Patriot for Me (1969), and Lost in the Stars (1972).

Television 
Cotsworth was seen in Killer's Choice, the premiere episode of Kraft Mystery Theatre, in June 1958, and in "The Thirty-first of February'", an episode of The Alfred Hitchcock Hour, in January 1963. He was in Macbeth when that play was presented on Hallmark Hall of Fame.

Art 
Cotsworth was also an artist. "He attended several art schools in this country and studied for seven years in Paris," at the Académie Colarossi. His work included illustrating Ernest Peixotto's book, A Bacchic Pilgrimage, published by Charles Scribner's Sons and painting "three murals for some swank bowling alleys in Washington." His work was exhibited at the Corcoran Gallery of Art in Washington and at the Pennsylvania Academy of the Fine Arts and the Water Color Club in Philadelphia.

A newspaper obituary described Cotsworth as "an accomplished painter of oils and watercolors," noting that at the time of his death he was "listed in the current Who's Who in American Art."

Union activities 
Cotsworth was elected a member of the New York Local Board of the American Federation of Radio Artists in 1946 and in 1949.

Personal life 
Cotsworth married Muriel Kirkland, an actress, in New York City on May 24, 1936. They remained married until her death in 1968. Later he married Josephine Hutchinson, who was also an actress.

Death 
Cotsworth died April 9, 1979, aged 71, in his apartment in Manhattan, New York. He was survived by his second wife Josephine.

Filmography

References

External links 

1908 births
1979 deaths
American male radio actors
American male stage actors
American male television actors
20th-century American male actors
Académie Colarossi alumni
Actors from Oak Park, Illinois
Male actors from Illinois